"Hot Rod Hearts" is a song by American singer Robbie Dupree, from his 1980 debut album Robbie Dupree. Released as the second single from the album, it reached No. 15 on the U.S. Billboard Hot 100 and No. 24 on the Adult Contemporary chart.  In Canada, the song reached No. 42 on the Pop chart.

Charts

References

External links
 

1980 singles
1980 songs
Robbie Dupree songs
Elektra Records singles
Songs written by Bill LaBounty